Lake Illawarra High School is a government-funded co-educational comprehensive secondary day school, located on Reddall Parade, which follows the shores of Lake Illawarra, in the Illawarra region of New South Wales, Australia.

Established in 1972, the school enrolled approximately 519 students in 2018, from Year 7 to Year 12, of whom 18 percent identified as Indigenous Australians and eight percent were from a language background other than English. The school is operated by the New South Wales Department of Education; the principal is Tony Hicks.

Overview 

The school is bordered by the suburbs of Mount Warrigal, Warilla and Lake Illawarra; and is in close proximity to Windang and Warilla beaches, Stockland Shellharbour and Warilla Grove shopping centres, Shellharbour TAFE College and Shellharbour Hospital.

The school offers a broad curriculum. In the junior years a special literacy class is available to students with learning difficulties. Extension opportunities are provided for talented students in a range of subject areas. In the senior school traditional academic subjects such as Physics, Chemistry, Economics, Extension Mathematics and English are offered. In addition vocational courses are offered in Hospitality and Catering, Building and Construction, Furnishings and Metals and Engineering.

The school emphasises the intrinsic worth of art and music as valuable cultural influences in the formation of the cultivated mind. Visual arts and Graphics students have designed and painted murals and features in strategic parts of the school. Music students have produced a number of CDs.

Many students are selected to represent Lake Illawarra High School in swimming, athletics and cross country carnivals, at zone, regional and state levels. Students are encouraged to enter state knock out competitions in a variety of sports.

See also 

 List of government schools in New South Wales
 List of schools in Illawarra and the NSW South East region
 Education in Australia

References

External links 
 

1972 establishments in Australia
Public high schools in New South Wales
Schools in Wollongong
Educational institutions established in 1972
City of Shellharbour